Nunthorpe Academy is an 11-18 Specialist Science, Business and Enterprise Academy in Nunthorpe, Middlesbrough, North Yorkshire, England. Houses are Endeavour, Triumph, Valiant, Victory, and Invincible.

History
In September 2008 the school opened a sixth form, which shares its design with Outwood Normanby's sixth form building.

Hermoine Jackson is the current head of Nunthorpe Sixth Form.

Nunthorpe School converted to Academy status on 1 October 2012.

Notable pupils
Aimee Willmott, Olympic swimmer
Chris Tomlinson, Olympic long jumper and former British long jump record holder
Jonathan Woodgate, former professional footballer who played for several clubs including  Real Madrid, Middlesbrough and Newcastle United
Kirsten O'Brien, Television presenter and radio host best known for hosting children's TV
Mattie Pollock, professional footballer who plays for Watford as a defender
Jordan Hugill, professional footballer who has played for West Ham United and Middlesbrough

Awards
A former headteacher of Nunthorpe School, Sir John Rowling, received a knighthood, in 2003, for services to education.

Nunthorpe Academy holds the Ofsted rating of "Good" since 2019; this was downgraded from "Outstanding", awarded in 2013.

References

External links
 

Secondary schools in Redcar and Cleveland
Academies in Redcar and Cleveland